Ilyinskoye is a rural locality (a selo) in Pershinskoye Rural Settlement, Kirzhachsky District, Vladimir Oblast, Russia. The population was 9 as of 2010. There are 8 streets.

Geography 
Ilyinskoye is located 21 km southeast of Kirzhach (the district's administrative centre) by road. Nikiforovo is the nearest rural locality.

References 

Rural localities in Kirzhachsky District